BrainHex is a neurobiology-based typology of gamer personality. It is formed in the early 2010s, by combining several then commonly used player personality typology. According to BrainHex, a gamer could be classified into these categories, based on their motivation to play video games:
Seekers enjoy exploring a game world. They are likely to enjoy games with rich and expanded worlds full of POIs to discover.
Survivors enjoy experiencing fear within a controlled setting and surviving the terror. They are likely to enjoy horror games.
Daredevils enjoy a thrilling experience that let them behave in risky ways in a virtual world, like driving at high speed in a racing game.
Masterminds enjoy solving puzzles and coming up with complex strategies.
Conquerors enjoy defeating difficult foes, whether the foes in question are controlled by AI or by other players.
Socialisers enjoy playing games as a way to socialise.
Achievers enjoy completing in-game challenges. They are likely to pursue 100% completion.

See also
Bartle taxonomy of player types

References

Literature
Busch, M., Mattheiss, E., Orji, R., Fröhlich, P., Lankes, M., & Tscheligi, M. (2016, May). Player type models: Towards empirical validation. In Proceedings of the 2016 CHI conference extended abstracts on human factors in computing systems (pp. 1835-1841).
Paulin, R. E., Battaiola, A. L., & Alves, M. M. (2014, June). The study of the relations between the brainhex player profiles, MBTI psychological types and emotions as means to enhance user experience. In International Conference of Design, User Experience, and Usability (pp. 732-741). Springer, Cham.
Monterrat, B., Desmarais, M., Lavoué, E., & George, S. (2015, June). A player model for adaptive gamification in learning environments. In International conference on artificial intelligence in education (pp. 297-306). Springer, Cham.
Video game culture
Personality tests